The 2000 Overseas Final was the twentieth running of the Overseas Final. The Final was held at the Poole Stadium in Poole, England on 18 June and was open to riders from the American Final and the Australian, British, New Zealand and South African Championships.

2000 Overseas Final
18 June
 Poole, Poole Stadium
Qualification: Top 8 plus 1 reserve to the Intercontinental Final in Holsted, Denmark

References

See also
 Motorcycle Speedway

2000
World Individual